The state of Indiana is home to 208 species of fishes that inhabit its rivers, lakes, and streams that make up five watersheds.  Indiana is the state with the most fish species of any state north of the Ohio River and includes Great Lakes species.

Native fishes taxa 
Status is determined from IUCN data in a global context. Classifications include critically endangered , endangered , vulnerable , near-threatened , and least concern .

Exotic or introduced taxa

References 

Hay, Oliver Perry. "The lampreys and fishes of Indiana." William B. Burford, Contractor for State Printing and Binding, 1894.
Jacquemin, Stephen J., and Mark Pyron. "Fishes of Indiana streams: current and historic assemblage structure." Hydrobiologia 665.1 (2011): 39-50.
Jordan, David S. "On the fishes of northern Indiana." Proceedings of the Academy of Natural Sciences of Philadelphia (1877): 42-82.
“Native Fish of Indiana.” Indiana Wildlife Federation, 2020, www.indianawildlife.org/wildlife/native-fish-of-indiana/.
Nelson, Joseph S., and Shelby Delos Gerking. Annotated key to the fishes of Indiana. Department of Zoology, Indiana University, 1968.
Simon, Thomas P. Fishes of Indiana: a field guide. Indiana University Press, 2011.
Simon, T.P., Whitaker, Jr., J.O., Castrale, J.S. and S.A. Minton. 2002. Revised checklist of the vertebrates of Indiana. Proceedings of the Indiana Academy of Science. 
111(2): 182-214.
“The IUCN Red List of Threatened Species.” IUCN Red List of Threatened Species, www.iucnredlist.org/.
“USFWS National Digital Library.” USFWS, digitalmedia.fws.gov/.

Indiana
Fish